Nordic and Scandinavian Canadians  are Canadian citizens with ancestral roots in the Nordic countries and/or Scandinavia

They generally include:

  Danish Canadians (Nordic and Scandinavian)
  Norwegian Canadians (Nordic and Scandinavian)
  Sami Canadians (Nordic and Scandinavian)
  Swedish Canadians (Nordic and Scandinavian)
 Finnish Canadians (Nordic)
 Icelandic Canadians (Nordic)

The highest concentration of Scandinavian Canadians is in Western Canada, especially British Columbia, Alberta and Saskatchewan.

As of the 2016 Canadian census, there are approximately 1.2 million Canadians of Nordic and Scandinavian descent, or about 3.49% of the total population of the country.

History

See also

 European Canadians
 Vinland
 L'Anse aux Meadows

References

External links
 "Immigration Handbook for Scandinavian Settlers in Canada, with Comprehensive Descriptions of Manitoba, the Northwest Territories and British Columbia" from 1899

 
 
Canada
American
American
American